The Jinzhou–Chengde railway is a passenger and freight railway line in China. It is used by trains carrying coal from Inner Mongolia to ports in Liaoning for export.

History
A new double-tracked section between Yebaishou station in Jianping County and Chaoyang South station in Shuangta District was opened on 24 December 2019, bypassing the original single-track alignment.

The section between Jinzhou and Chaoyang South was also upgraded.

Incident
No casualties were reported, and the line was reopened the following day.

References

Railway lines in China